The Golden Leopard is the top prize at the Locarno International Film Festival, an international film festival held annually in Locarno, Switzerland since 1946. Directors in the process of getting an international reputation are allowed to be entered in the competitive selection. The winning films are chosen by a jury. The award went under many names until it was named the Golden Leopard in 1968. The festival was not held in 1951 and the prize was not awarded in 1956 and 1982. As of 2009 René Clair and Jiří Trnka are the only two directors to have won the award twice, both of them winning in consecutive years.

Golden Leopard winners
For the first two years the award was known as Best Film (Miglior film). Then for several years the award went by the name of Grand Prize (Gran premio). In 1950 and 1951 the award was from the International Jury of Journalists (Giuria internazionale dei giornalisti); in 1953 and 1954 the award was from the International Jury of Critics (Giuria internazionale della critica); in 1955 the award was from the Jury of Swiss-Italian Radio (Giuria della Radio della Svizzera Italiana); in 1957 the award was from the Jury of the Swiss Association of Cinematographic Press (Giuria dell'Associazione Svizzera della stampa cinematografica). In 1958 and 1960–65 the award was the Golden Sail (Vela d'oro). In 1959 it was the Prize for Best Direction (Premio per la migliore regia). In 1966 and 1967 the prize was the Grand Prize of the Jury of Youth (Gran premio della Giuria dei giovani). Finally, it became the Golden Leopard in 1968.

References

External links 
 Official site
 IMDb

International film awards
Locarno Festival
Swiss film awards

Awards established in 1946
1946 establishments in Switzerland